The 1998 World Women's Curling Championship (branded as 1998 Ford World Women's Curling Championship for sponsorship reasons) was held at Riverside Coliseum in Kamloops, British Columbia from April 4–12, 1998.

Teams

Round-robin standings

Round-robin results

Draw 1

Draw 2

Draw 3

Draw 4

Draw 5

Draw 6

Draw 7

Draw 8

Draw 9

Playoffs

Brackets

Final

References

External link
Semi-final on YouTube 
Final (last 2 ends) on YouTube 
Bronze medal game on YouTube

W
World Women's Curling Championship
Sport in Kamloops
Curling in British Columbia
1998 in Canadian curling
1998 in British Columbia
April 1998 sports events in Canada
Women's curling competitions in Canada
1998 in Canadian women's sports
Sports competitions in British Columbia
International sports competitions hosted by Canada